A fishery improvement project, or FIP, is a multi-stakeholder effort to improve the sustainability of a fishery. While FIPs vary in scope and nature, to be considered as such, a FIP must meet a number of requirements pertaining to participation, funding, transparency, and scientific rigor. By 2015, there were over 80 fishery improvement projects around the world, representing approximately 10% of the current wild seafood production. By 2021, at least registered at FisheryProgress.org Council, there are more than 130 functional FIPs around the globe.

See also
 Gordon and Betty Moore Foundation
 Marine Stewardship Council
 Ocean Outcomes
 Packard Foundation
 Sustainable seafood
 WWF
EDF

References

External links 
 FisheryProgres.org website (cataloguing and tracking FIPs)
 Are Fisheries Improvement Projects really delivering change on the water? (WWF)

Sustainable fishery